La Revue hebdomadaire was a literary magazine founded in 1892 by  and published until 1939.

History
In 1908, it absorbed the monthly magazine .

After having been its secretary in the 1910s, then its editor-in-chief in November 1920, succeeding René Moulin,  (1881–1966) became its director, a position he kept from October 1922 until 1939. Le Grix called on new collaborators such as François Mauriac (who called him “La Grise” in the 1910s, because of his displayed homosexuality), responsible for the theatrical section from 1921 to 1923, Edmond Jaloux (literary life), Wladimir d'Ormesson (foreign policy),  (Parisian life, then political chronicle from 1928), Gustave Fagniez and Frantz Funck-Brentano (history),  (religious life), Paul Reynaud (parliamentary forum). The literary magazine founded in 1929 the prize Prix du Premier Roman.

The success of the Cartel des Gauches led the journal to take a stand in political debates and gradually become radicalized. Le Grix was then an unparliamentary conservative and hostile to democracy. In 1934 and 1935, he went several times to Italy, where he met Benito Mussolini. The fascist dictator granted him financial assistance with two million francs, which enabled him to buy the daily .

References

External links
 La Revue hebdomadaire in Gallica, the digital library of BnF.

1892 establishments in France
1939 disestablishments in France
Defunct literary magazines published in France
Weekly magazines published in France
Magazines established in 1892
Magazines disestablished in 1939